Joseph Creswell (real name Arthur) (1557 of Yorkshire stock in London – c. 1623) was an English Jesuit controversialist.

Life
Creswell joined the Society of Jesus at Rome, 11 October 1583, having previously studied at Reims and at the Roman College. Having been rector (1589–1592) after Robert Persons at the English College, Rome, he also succeeded Persons as vice-prefect for the English Jesuit interests in Spain.

Creswell's character and conduct in connection with his difficulties over the seminaries in Seville and Valladolid, and his controversies about the Benedictine vocations have been criticized. Father Creswell had considerable intercourse with Sir Charles Cornwallis, the English resident at Madrid, till the Gunpowder Plot, when Creswell was summoned to Rome.

Sent to Belgium in 1614, he was at St-Omer in 1620, and in 1621 was made rector of Ghent.

Works
His chief works are:

A Latin treatise, "De Vita Beata";
"Exemplar Literarun ad Cecilium (sive Burleigh)", 1592, under the pseudonym "John Perne", against Elizabeth's proclamation of 29 November 1591; 
"Vida y Martyrio del P. Henrique Valpolo" (Madrid, 1596); 
A treatise against James I's (1610) proclamation (4to, St-Omer, 1611);
"Meditations upon the Rosary" (St-Omer, 1620);
A translation into Spanish, under the name "Peter Manrique" of Father William Bathe's "Preparation for Administering Penance and the Eucharist" (Milan, 1614); 
A translation into English and Spanish, under initials N. T., of Salvian's "Quis dives salvus?" (St-Omer, 1618);
"Relacion de Inglaterra", Ms X, 14, National Library, Madrid;
Memoir for Philip III of Spain on affairs of the Society;
Responsio ad Calumnias. Stonyhurst Library, Letters, Vatican archives (Lettere di particolari, I, 1).

Family
His widowed mother married William Lacey, who, after her death, was ordained priest and martyred (22 August 1582) at York.

Notes

References
Attribution
  The entry cites:
Henry Foley, Records, VI and VII
George Oliver, Collectanea S. J.
Douay diaries, p. xclx
Charles Butler, Memoirs, II, 224
Sommervogel, Bibliothèque, II, 1656

1557 births
1623 deaths
Rectors of the English College, Rome
Jesuits from London
16th-century English Jesuits
17th-century English Jesuits